Get Rich Quick is a 1996 Ned Kelly Award-winning novel by the Australian author Peter Doyle.

Awards
Ned Kelly Awards for Crime Writing, Best First Novel, 1997: joint winner

Reviews
 "Australian Crime Fiction database"

References
"GET RICH QUICK (Book)." Kirkus Reviews 72.14 (15 July 2004): 661–662.
Lunn, Bob, and Rex E. Klett.. "Get Rich Quick (Book)." Library Journal 129.16 (Oct. 2004): 65-65.

Australian crime novels
1996 Australian novels
Ned Kelly Award-winning works